Giuseppe Tornatore (born 27 May 1956) is an Italian film director and screenwriter. He is considered one of the directors who brought critical acclaim back to Italian cinema. In a career spanning over 30 years he is best known for directing and writing drama films such as Everybody's Fine, The Legend of 1900, Malèna, Baarìa and The Best Offer. His most noted film is Cinema Paradiso, for which Tornatore won the Academy Award for Best Foreign Language Film. He has also directed several advertising campaigns for Dolce & Gabbana.

Tornatore is also known for his long-standing association with composer Ennio Morricone, who composed music for thirteen Tornatore feature films since 1988.

Life and career

Born in Bagheria, near Palermo, Tornatore developed an interest in acting and the theatre from at least the age of 16 and put on works by Luigi Pirandello and Eduardo De Filippo.

He worked initially as a freelance photographer. Then, switching to cinema, he made his debut with Le minoranze etniche in Sicilia (The Ethnic Minorities in Sicily), a collaborative documentary film which won a Salerno Festival prize. He then worked for RAI before releasing his first full-length film, Il Camorrista, in 1985. This evoked a positive response from audiences and critics alike and Tornatore was awarded the Silver Ribbon for best new director.

In 1988, a collaboration with producer Franco Cristaldi gave birth to Tornatore's best known screen work: Cinema Paradiso, a film narrating the life of a successful film director who has returned to his native town in Sicily for the funeral of his mentor. This obtained worldwide success and won an Academy Award for Best Foreign Language Film. Subsequently, Tornatore released several other films. In 2007 he won the Silver George for Best Director at the 29th Moscow International Film Festival for The Unknown Woman.

Personal life
Tornatore describes himself as "one who does not believe and who regrets this". His brother, Francesco Tornatore, is a producer.

Filmography

Written and directed
1986: The Professor (Il camorrista)
1988: Cinema Paradiso (Nuovo Cinema Paradiso)
1990: Everybody's Fine (Stanno tutti bene)
1991: Especially on Sunday (segment "Il cane blu")
1994: A Pure Formality (Una pura formalità)
1995: The Star Maker (L'uomo delle stelle)
1995: Lo schermo a tre punte (documentary)
1996: Ritratti d'autore: seconda serie (documentary)
1998: The Legend of 1900 (La leggenda del pianista sull'oceano)
2000: Malèna
2006: The Unknown Woman (La sconosciuta)
2009: Baarìa
2013: The Best Offer (La migliore offerta)
2016: The Correspondence (La corrispondenza)
2021: Ennio - The Maestro

Screenplay only
Cento giorni a Palermo ("One Hundred Days in Palermo"), directed by Giuseppe Ferrara (1984) - Tornatore is credited under the name Peppuccio Tornatore

References

Further reading
Giuseppe Tornatore. Uno sguardo dal set a cura di Ninni Panzera, Silvana Editoriale, Cinisello Balsamo 2007
L'isola di Tornatore a cura di Ninni Panzera, Silvana Editoriale, Cinisello Balsamo 2010
Le Madonie, cinema ad alte quote di Sebastiano Gesù e Elena Russo, con introduzione di Francesco Novara e presentazione di Pasquale Scimeca, Giuseppe Maimone Editore, Catania 1995 (Nuovo Cinema Paradiso and L'Uomo delle Stelle)

External links

1956 births
European Film Awards winners (people)
Best Original Screenplay BAFTA Award winners 
Living people
People from Bagheria
Italian atheists
Italian film directors
David di Donatello winners
Nastro d'Argento winners
Ciak d'oro winners
Directors of Best Foreign Language Film Academy Award winners
Filmmakers who won the Best Foreign Language Film BAFTA Award
Film people from Sicily